The Gunner River is a river on the West Coast of New Zealand. It rises in the Domett Range in the Kahurangi National Park and flows north-west into the Heaphy River, which flows into the Tasman Sea.

A swingbridge crosses the river near its junction with the Heaphy. This bridge is part of the Heaphy Track. Heavy rain in the Buller District in February 2022 caused significant damage. The suspension bridge over the Gunner River was damaged but is deemed repairable, while the Pitt Creek bridge was swept away, and the suspension bridge over the Heaphy River was destroyed. The West Coast end of the Heaphy Track is predicted to be closed for several months.

See also
List of rivers of New Zealand

References

Land Information New Zealand – Search for Place Names

Buller District
Rivers of the West Coast, New Zealand
Kahurangi National Park
Rivers of New Zealand